George Jones Sings His Greatest Hits is an album by George Jones, released on Starday Records in 1962.

Although the album is billed as a greatest hits package, it is identical to his 1957 LP Grand Ole Opry's New Star with a shuffled running order.  "Why Baby Why," "What Am I Worth," "Yearning" (duet with Jeanette Hicks), and "You Gotta Be My Baby" were top ten hits.

Track listing
"Why Baby Why" (George Jones/Darrell Edwards)
"It's Okay" (Jones)
"Still Hurting" (Jones)
"Boat of Life" (Jones)
"Seasons of My Heart" (Jones/Edwards)
"Taggin' Along" (Jones/Burl Stephens)
"Yearning" (with Jeanette Hicks) (Eddie Eddings/Jones)
"Hold Everything" (Jones)
"Your Heart" (Jones/Edwards)
"Play It Cool" (Jones)
"What Am I Worth" (Jones/Edwards)
"Let Him Know" (Jones)
"You Gotta Be My Baby" (Jones)
"I'm Ragged But I'm Right" (Jones)

1962 compilation albums
George Jones compilation albums
Starday Records compilation albums